William Adam Reid (born 28 October 1958) is a Scottish songwriter, musician and singer. Songwriter, guitarist, co-founder and occasional singer of the Scottish alternative rock band, The Jesus and Mary Chain.

Musical career

The Jesus and Mary Chain

William, along with his brother Jim, the lead singer, formed the (at times unstable) core of the band. The early sound of The Jesus and Mary Chain was defined by Reid's extremely distorted and feedback laden hollowbody guitar work, often using the Shin-ei Companion WF-8 fuzz-wah box to get his unique sound, which verged on white noise. Reid effectively ended the band in late 1998, when he walked off stage fifteen minutes into a show at the House of Blues.

The Jesus and Mary Chain reformed in early 2007 to play concert dates in Europe and the US.

Solo
After The Jesus and Mary Chain split up in 1999, Reid began performing solo under the name Lazycame. Reid has also been involved in the production of the Sister Vanilla album, Little Pop Rock, featuring the Reid brothers' younger sister, Linda Reid.

Personal life
Reid was raised in East Kilbride, Scotland and attended Hunter High School.

Discography

The Jesus and Mary Chain

William
 Tired of Fucking (Four song EP, 1998) UK #198

Lazycame
 Taster (6 song EP, 1999)
 Finbegin (album, 1999)
 Yawn! (5 songs + 14 hidden tracks, 2000)
 Saturday The Fourteenth (album, 2000)

References

1958 births
Living people
Scottish rock guitarists
Scottish male guitarists
Scottish male singer-songwriters
British alternative rock musicians
The Jesus and Mary Chain members
People from East Kilbride